Atomiscala islandica is a species of sea snail, a marine gastropod mollusc in the family Cimidae.

Distribution
This marine species is known from the water of the Atlantic Ocean around Iceland.

References

External links
  Serge GOFAS, Ángel A. LUQUE, Joan Daniel OLIVER,José TEMPLADO & Alberto SERRA (2021) - The Mollusca of Galicia Bank (NE Atlantic Ocean); European Journal of Taxonomy 785: 1–114
 To CLEMAM
 To Encyclopedia of Life

Cimidae
Gastropods described in 1989